Palestine competed at the 2016 Summer Olympics in Rio de Janeiro, Brazil, from 5 to 21 August 2016. This was the nation's sixth consecutive appearance at the Summer Olympics.

Palestine Olympic Committee sent the nation's largest ever delegation to the Games. A total of six athletes, four men and two women, were selected to the Palestinian team across four different sports. Four of them were invited to compete in their respective sporting events, with the other two qualifying for the Games on merit. Among the sports represented by the athletes, Palestine marked its Olympic debut in equestrian.

The Palestinian roster featured middle-distance freestyle swimmer Ahmed Gebrel, the lone returning Olympian from London 2012, and three of its athletes being born and raised in Germany: judoka Simon Yacoub (men's 66 kg), Dressage horse rider and dual citizen Christian Zimmermann, and marathon runner Mayada Al-Sayad, who led the delegation as the nation's flag bearer in the opening ceremony, the second female in history since Sanna Abubkheet did so in 2004. Palestine, whose athletes have been allowed to compete under its flag by the International Olympic Committee only since 1996, has yet to win its first Olympic medal.

Athletics
 

Palestinian athletes have so far achieved qualifying standards in the following athletics events (up to a maximum of 3 athletes in each event):

Track & road events

Equestrian
 
Palestine entered one rider into the Olympic equestrian competition by virtue of a top finish from Africa and the Middle East in the individual FEI Olympic rankings, signifying the nation's Olympic debut in the sport.

Individual Dressage

Judo
 
Palestine has received an invitation from the Tripartite Commission to send a judoka competing in the men's extra-lightweight category (60 kg) to the Olympics.

Swimming

Palestine has received a Universality invitation from FINA to send two swimmers (one male and one female) to the Olympics.

References

External links 
 

Nations at the 2016 Summer Olympics
2016
Oly